Yeşilköy is a village in the Mazıdağı District of Mardin Province in Turkey. The village is populated by Kurds and had a population of 425 in 2021.

History 
The two clans in the village had been feuding for 75 years, from 1935 to 2010, until the BDP brokered peace between them. Osman Baydemir took part in the talks.

References 

Villages in Mazıdağı District
Kurdish settlements in Mardin Province